Leandro Lessa Azevedo, (born 13 August 1980), simply known as Leandro, is a Brazilian former footballer who played as a striker.

Club statistics

Honours
Corinthians
Brazil Cup: 2002
Tournament Rio - São Paulo: 2002

Fluminense
Rio de Janeiro State League: 2005

São Paulo
Brazilian League: 2006, 2007

Grêmio
Rio Grande do Sul State League: 2010

Vasco da Gama
Brazil Cup: 2011

External links

 globoesporte.globo.com
 CBF
 sambafoot

1980 births
Living people
Brazilian footballers
Brazilian expatriate footballers
Botafogo Futebol Clube (SP) players
Sport Club Corinthians Paulista players
FC Lokomotiv Moscow players
Expatriate footballers in Russia
Goiás Esporte Clube players
Fluminense FC players
São Paulo FC players
Tokyo Verdy players
Grêmio Foot-Ball Porto Alegrense players
CR Vasco da Gama players
Fortaleza Esporte Clube players
Expatriate footballers in Japan
Campeonato Brasileiro Série A players
Russian Premier League players
J1 League players
J2 League players
Association football forwards
People from Ribeirão Preto
Footballers from São Paulo (state)